Friedrich Ernst Dorn (27 July 1848 – 16 December 1916) was a German physicist who was the first to discover that a radioactive substance, later named radon, is emitted from radium.

Life and work
Dorn was born in Guttstadt (Dobre Miasto), Province of Prussia (nowadays Warmia in Poland), and died in Halle, Province of Saxony.  He was educated at Königsberg and went on to teach at the university level. In 1885, at Halle University, Dorn took over the position of personal ordinarius professor for theoretical physics from Anton Oberbeck. Since Dorn was already an ordinarius professor, he was allowed to assume the title so as to not appear as having been demoted.  In 1895, Dorn succeeded Hermann Knoblauch at Halle as the ordinarius professor for experimental physics and director of the physics institute. Dorn's previous duties were assumed by Carl Schmidt, who had been a Privatdozent and was called as an extraordinarius professor for theoretical physics.

In 1900, Dorn published a paper in which he described experiments that repeated and extended some earlier work on thorium by Ernest Rutherford. Dorn verified Rutherford's observation that a radioactive material was emitted by thorium, and discovered that a similar emission arose from the element radium. Additional work by Rutherford and Soddy showed that the same emission came from both thorium and radium, that it was a gas, and that it was actually a new element.

Dorn called the radioactive gaseous product from radium simply "emanation", but in 1904 Rutherford introduced the name "radium emanation" for the same material.  Ramsay later suggested "niton", from the Latin word "nitens" meaning "shining".  In 1923 the name was again changed, this time to radon by an international body of scientists.

Marshall and Marshall have examined the original papers leading to radon's discovery and their work should be consulted for a full treatment and extensive references.  They conclude that it is actually Rutherford who should be awarded credit for radon's discovery since he was the first to detect the element being emitted from any radioisotope (thorium) and the first to demonstrate radon's gaseous nature. Rutherford was also the first to integrate his own work on radon with that of others on radon's atomic mass, its spectrum, and its position on the periodic table.

References

Further reading
Jungnickel, Christa and Russell McCormmach.  Intellectual Mastery of Nature: Theoretical Physics from Ohm to Einstein, Volume 1: The Torch of Mathematics, 1800 to 1870.  University of Chicago Press, 1990a.
Jungnickel, Christa and Russell McCormmach.   Intellectual Mastery of Nature: Theoretical Physics from Ohm to Einstein, Volume 2: The Now Mighty Theoretical Physics, 1870 to 1925.   University of Chicago Press, 1990b.

1848 births
1916 deaths
Discoverers of chemical elements
People from Dobre Miasto
People from the Province of Prussia
University of Königsberg alumni
Academic staff of the Martin Luther University of Halle-Wittenberg
19th-century German physicists
20th-century German physicists